Hour of Reckoning is a 1927 American silent drama film directed by John Ince and starring Herbert Rawlinson, Grace Darmond and Harry von Meter.

Synopsis
A clerk at a safe manufacturing company is wrongly accused of steal money, when the real culprit is the owner's son.

Cast
 Herbert Rawlinson as Jim Armstrong
 Grace Darmond as 	Marion Hastings
 John Ince as Winton Crane
 Harry von Meter as Turner
 James B. Lowe as Servant
 Virginia Castleman	
 John J. Darby 	
 Edwin Middleton

References

Bibliography
 Munden, Kenneth White. The American Film Institute Catalog of Motion Pictures Produced in the United States, Part 1. University of California Press, 1997.

External links
 

1927 films
1927 drama films
1920s English-language films
American silent feature films
Silent American drama films
American black-and-white films
Films directed by John Ince
1920s American films